INS Sindhukirti (S61) (Glory of the Sea) is the seventh  diesel-electric submarine of the Indian Navy. She was built at the Admiralty Shipyard and Sevmash in the Soviet Union.

Sindukirti was commissioned on 9 December 1989 in the Soviet Union, with Cdr. Ramdas signing her commissioning orders. She underwent a protracted "medium refit" from June 2006 until May 2015 at the Hindustan Shipyard at Visakhapatnam. The midlife upgrade was projected to be completed in 3 years but numerous delays postponed the submarine's return. Having spent one third of her life in refit, she finally returned to service on 23 May 2015.

Description
The complement is about 68, including 7 officers and 61 sailors.

The submarine has a shaft with one seven-blade propeller. It is powered by two diesel generators, each of which produce . She can achieve a maximum speed of  when on surface and   when submerged.

Operational service and refit 
INS Sindhukirti was commissioned on 9 December 1989, by Cdr. Kannan Ramdas. She is the seventh of the ten Sindhughosh-class submarines.

Midlife Medium refit 
Sindhukirti was docked at Hindustan Shipyard in June 2006 for a midlife refit which included installation of USHUS sonar and the Klub-S cruise missiles and other hull works. It was originally planned to send her to Russia for the upgrade, like her sister ships Sindhughosh, Sindhuvir, Sindhuratna, and Sindhuvijay. However, it was decided that Sindhukirti would be upgraded indigenously. Hindustan Shipyard was selected for the refit due to political wrangling, against the wishes of the navy staff. HSL had a history of prolonging submarine refits, taking ten years to upgrade each of the Vela-class submarines Vela and Vagli.

Sindhukirti'''s refit was scheduled for 3 years, but the refit dragged on as problems arose.  The ship became known as the dockyard queen. In 2009, Admiral Sureesh Mehta explained, "That kind of expertise did not exist in India before and this is for the first time that we are trying it out here. Instead of sending them to Russia all the way, this one is being offloaded to Hindustan Shipyards. There are some problems in their procurement procedures. It takes a little longer than is expected". While a Russian shipyard would deploy 200 workers in three shifts to complete the refit in two years, HSL deployed only 50 workers to work on Sindhukirti.

After nine years in refit, Sindhukirti finally returned to sea on 23 May 2015 and is currently active.

In popular culture
INS Sindhukirti'' was featured in series 'Breaking point Indian Submariners' which was released on Veer by Discovery YouTube channel.

References

Sindhughosh-class submarines
Attack submarines
Ships built in the Soviet Union
Ships built at Admiralty Shipyard
1989 ships
Submarines of India